Stephen Paxman (born 4 December 1970) is a former professional Australian rules footballer who played for the Fitzroy Football Club and the Port Adelaide Football Club in the Australian Football League (AFL).

AFL career

Fitzroy career (1991–1996)
He began his career with the Fitzroy Football Club in 1991, he went on to play 102 games for the club before the merger with the Brisbane Bears.

Port Adelaide career (1997–2003)
Not wanting to join the newly formed Brisbane Lions, he ended up being picked up in the 1997 pre-season draft the newly joined team in the AFL, the Port Adelaide Power.

He became quite a solid defender and was always a workhorse he won the 1999 John Cahill Medal. He retired at the end of the 2003 season after playing every game of the season.

Despite being known as a dour defender, Paxman kicked 38 goals during his career which is an unusually high number for a full back. In season 2000, Paxman kicked 6 goals in the last 13 games while mostly playing at full back.

References

External links
 
 

Fitzroy Football Club players
Port Adelaide Football Club players
Port Adelaide Football Club players (all competitions)
Greenvale Football Club players
John Cahill Medal winners
Australian rules footballers from Victoria (Australia)
1970 births
Living people